Minuscule 504 (in the Gregory-Aland numbering), 585 (in the Scrivener's numbering), ε 111 (in the Soden numbering), is a Greek minuscule manuscript of the New Testament, on parchment, dated to the year 1033.
The  manuscript has complex context with full marginalia. It was adapted for liturgical use.

Description 

The codex contains the complete text of the four Gospels on 287 parchment leaves (size ). It is written in one column per page, 20 lines per page.

There is also a division according to the smaller Ammonian Sections (in Mark 240 sections – the last section in 16:19), with references to the Eusebian Canons.

It has many marginal corrections of the text.

Text 

The Greek text of the codex is a representative of the Byzantine text-type. Hermann von Soden classified it to the textual family Kx. Aland placed it in Category V.
According to the Claremont Profile Method it represents the textual family Kx in Luke 1, Luke 10, and Luke 20.

History 

The manuscript is dated by a colophon to the year 1033.

The manuscript was written by Synesius, a priest. It was bought by H. Rodd in 1848.

The manuscript was added to the list of New Testament manuscripts by Scrivener (585) and C. R. Gregory (504). It was examined by Scrivener, Gregory (in 1883), and Kirsopp Lake.

It is currently housed at the British Library (Add MS 17470) in London.

See also 

 List of New Testament minuscules
 Biblical manuscript
 Textual criticism

References

Further reading 

 Dated Greek Minuscule Manuscripts to the year 1200, ed. Kirsopp Lake and Silva Lake, vol. II, p. 69.
 Facsimiles of Manuscripts and Inscriptions, ed. E. A. Bond, E. M. Thompson and others, I (London, 1873–1883), p. 202.

Greek New Testament minuscules
11th-century biblical manuscripts
British Library additional manuscripts